Tantu Pagelaran or Tangtu Panggelaran is an Old Javanese manuscript written in the Kawi language that originated from the 15th century Majapahit period. The manuscript describes the mythical origin of Java island.

Legend of moving Meru to Java
The manuscript explained that Batara Guru (Shiva) ordered the god Brahma and Vishnu to fill the island of Java with human beings. However at that time Java island was floating freely on the ocean, ever tumbling and always shaking. To make the island still, the gods decided to nail the island upon the earth by moving a part of Mahameru in Jambudvipa (India) and attaching it upon Java.

The god Vishnu transformed into a giant turtle and carried a part of mount Meru upon his back, while the god Brahma transformed into a giant naga serpent and wrapped his body around the mountain and giant turtle's back, so the Meru mountain can be transported safely to Java. 

Initially the gods placed the holy mountain on the first part of Java they had arrived upon, which is the western part of Java. However the enormous weight of the Meru mountain had tilted the island and caused the imbalance; the eastern end of Java had risen up high. The gods decided to move the mountain eastward; by doing so the gods had scattered the mountain fragments and created the volcanoes and mountainous regions spanned from west to east along Java. When the main part of the Meru mountain attached upon the eastern part of Java, the island was still tilted and not well balanced, this time it was the western part of that Java rose up. To make the island balanced, the gods cut a small tip and placed in northwest part of East Java. The tip become Mount Pawitra that today identified with Mount Penanggungan, while the main part of Meru mountain became Semeru volcano and became the abode of Lord Shiva. 

When Sang Hyang Shiva arrived at Java, he saw so many Jawawut plants, thus the island named Java. Vishnu became the first ruler of Java and incarnated as the king named Kandiawan. He brought civilizations and upheld order and managed government, social, and religious matters.

Interpretation  
The mountainous volcanic nature and geographic conditions of Java and Bali corresponds and is suitable with Hindu mythology. Hindu cosmology believed that Mount Meru or Mahameru is the abode of gods and connected the realm of mortals with svarga, the realm of gods. People of Java and Bali still revere mountain as the abode of Gods, Devata, Hyang, and other spiritual beings. The legend that mentioned that the island of Java is occasionally shaking is interpreted as the traditional native way to explains the earthquake natural phenomena.

Notes

References
Dr. R. Soekmono, Pengantar Sejarah Kebudayaan Indonesia (Cultural History basic of Indonesia), Yogyakarta, Kanisius, 1973 

Kakawin
Hindu texts